

Events

Pre-1600
4004 BC – James Ussher's proposed creation date of the world according to the Bible.
42 BC – Liberators' civil war: Mark Antony and Octavian decisively defeat an army under Brutus in the second part of the Battle of Philippi, with Brutus committing suicide and ending the civil war.
 425 – Valentinian III is elevated as Roman emperor at the age of six.
 502 – The Synodus Palmaris, called by Gothic king Theoderic, absolves Pope Symmachus of all charges, thus ending the schism of Antipope Laurentius.
1086 – Spanish Reconquista: At the Battle of Sagrajas, the Almoravids defeats the Castilians, but are unable to take advantage of their victory.
1157 – The Battle of Grathe Heath ends the Danish Civil War.
1295 – The first treaty forming the Auld Alliance between Scotland and France against England is signed in Paris.

1601–1900
1641 – Irish Catholic gentry from Ulster attempt to seize control of Dublin Castle, the seat of English rule in Ireland, so as to force concessions.
1642 – The Battle of Edgehill is the first major battle of the English Civil War.
1707 – The First Parliament of the Kingdom of Great Britain convenes.
1798 – The forces of Ali Pasha of Janina defeat the French and capture the town of Preveza in the Battle of Nicopolis.
1812 – General Claude François de Malet begins a conspiracy to overthrow Napoleon, claiming that the Emperor died in the Russian campaign.
1850 – The first National Women's Rights Convention begins in Worcester, Massachusetts.
1864 – American Civil War: The Battle of Westport is the last significant engagement west of the Mississippi River, ending in a Union victory.

1901–present
1906 – Alberto Santos-Dumont flies an airplane in the first heavier-than-air flight in Europe.
1911 – The Italo-Turkish War sees the first use of an airplane in combat when an Italian pilot makes a reconnaissance flight.
1912 – First Balkan War: The Battle of Kumanovo between the Serbian and Ottoman armies begins.
1927 – The Imatra Cinema was destroyed in a fire in Tampere, Finland, during showing the 1924 film Wages of Virtue; 21 people died in the fire and almost 30 were injured.
1940 – Adolf Hitler and Francisco Franco meet at Hendaye to discuss the possibility of Spain entering the Second World War.
1941 – The Holocaust: Nazi Germany prohibits Jews from emigrating, including in its occupied territories. 
1942 – World War II: Allied forces commence the Second Battle of El Alamein, which proves to be the key turning point in the North African campaign.
  1942   – All 12 passengers and crewmen aboard American Airlines Flight 28 are killed when it collides with a U.S. Army Air Force bomber near Palm Springs, California.
  1942   – World War II: The Battle for Henderson Field begins on Guadalcanal.
1944 – World War II: The Battle of Leyte Gulf begins.
1955 – Prime Minister Ngô Đình Diệm defeats former emperor Bảo Đại in a referendum and founds the Republic of Vietnam.
1955 – The people of the Saar region vote in a referendum to unite with West Germany instead of France.
1956 – Secret police shoot several anti-communist protesters, igniting the Hungarian Revolution.
1958 – Canada's Springhill mining disaster kills seventy-five miners, while ninety-nine others are rescued.
1965 – Vietnam War: The 1st Cavalry Division (Airmobile), in conjunction with the Army of the Republic of Vietnam, launches an operation seeking to destroy Communist forces during the siege of Plei Me.
1970 – Gary Gabelich sets a land speed record in a rocket-powered automobile called the Blue Flame, fueled with natural gas.
1972 – Vietnam War: Operation Linebacker, a US bombing campaign against North Vietnam in response to its Easter Offensive, ends after five months.
1982 – A gunfight breaks out between police officers and members of a religious cult in Arizona. The shootout leaves two cultists dead and dozens of cultists and police officers injured. 
1983 – Lebanese Civil War: The U.S. Marines Corps barracks in Beirut is hit by a truck bomb, killing 241 U.S. military personnel.  A French Army barracks in Lebanon is also hit that same morning, killing 58 troops.
1989 – The Hungarian Republic officially replaces the communist Hungarian People's Republic.
  1989   – Bankruptcy of Wärtsilä Marine; the biggest bankruptcy in the Nordic countries up until then.
  1989   – An explosion at the Houston Chemical Complex in Pasadena, Texas, which registered a 3.5 on the Richter magnitude scale, kills 23 and injures 314.
1991 – Signing of the Paris Peace Accords which ends the Cambodian–Vietnamese War.
1993 – The Troubles: A Provisional IRA bomb prematurely detonates in Belfast, killing the bomber and nine civilians. 
1995 – Yolanda Saldívar is found guilty of first-degree murder in the shooting death of popular Latin singer Selena.
1998 – Israel and the Palestinian Authority sign the Wye River Memorandum.
2001 – Apple Computer releases the iPod.
2002 – Second Chechen War: Chechen separatist terrorists seize the House of Culture theater in Moscow and take approximately 700 theater-goers hostage.
2004 – A powerful earthquake and its aftershocks hit Niigata Prefecture in northern Japan, killing 35 people, injuring 2,200, and leaving 85,000 homeless or evacuated.
2007 – A storm causes the Mexican Kab 101 oil platform to collide with a wellhead, leading to the death and drowning of 22 people during rescue operations after evacuation of the platform.
2011 – A powerful 7.2 magnitude earthquake strikes Van Province, Turkey, killing 582 people and injuring thousands.
  2011   – The Libyan National Transitional Council deems the Libyan Civil War over.
2015 – The lowest sea-level pressure in the Western Hemisphere, and the highest reliably-measured non-tornadic sustained winds, are recorded in Hurricane Patricia, which strikes Mexico hours later, killing at least 13 and causing over $280 million in damages.
2022 – Xi Jinping is elected as General Secretary of the Chinese Communist Party by the Central Committee, beginning a third term of the paramount leader of China.
 2022    – Myanmar Air Force airstrikes a concert in Hpakant Township, Kachin state killing at least 80 people, including senior Kachin Independence Organisation officials, in the Hpakant massacre.

Births

Pre-1600
1006 – Wen Yanbo, Chinese grand chancellor (d. 1097)
1255 – Ferdinand de la Cerda, Spanish noble (d. 1275)
1491 (estimated) – Ignatius of Loyola, Catholic priest (d. 1556)
1516 – Charlotte of Valois, French princess (d. 1524)

1601–1900
1634 – Hedwig Eleonora of Holstein-Gottorp, Swedish queen (d. 1715)
1654 – Johann Bernhard Staudt, Austrian composer (d. 1712)
1698 – Ange-Jacques Gabriel, French architect, designed the École Militaire (d. 1782)
1705 – Maximilian Ulysses Browne, Austrian field marshal (d. 1757)
1713 – Pieter Burman the Younger, Dutch philologist, poet, and educator (d. 1778)
1762 – Samuel Morey, American engineer (d. 1843)
1766 – Emmanuel de Grouchy, Marquis de Grouchy, French general (d. 1847)
1790 – Chauncey Allen Goodrich, American minister, lexicographer, and educator (d. 1860)
1796 – Stefano Franscini, Swiss statistician and politician (d. 1857)
1801 – Albert Lortzing, German singer-songwriter and actor (d. 1851)
1805 – John Russell Bartlett, American linguist and historian (d. 1886)
1813 – Ludwig Leichhardt, German-Australian explorer (d. 1848)
1815 – João Maurício Vanderlei, Baron of Cotejipe, Brazilian politician (d. 1889)
1817 – Pierre Larousse, French lexicographer and author (d. 1875)
1822 – Gustav Spörer, German astronomer (d. 1895)
1832 – Johan Gabriel Ståhlberg, Finnish priest and father of K. J. Ståhlberg, the first President of Finland (d. 1873)
1835 – Adlai Stevenson I, American lawyer and politician, 23rd Vice President of the United States (d. 1914)
1837 – Moritz Kaposi, Hungarian dermatologist (d. 1902)
1844 – Sarah Bernhardt, French actress (d. 1923)
  1844   – Robert Bridges, English poet and playwright (d. 1930)
1857 – Juan Luna, Filipino painter and sculptor (d. 1899)
1863 – Mirko Breyer, Croatian writer, bibliographer, antiquarian, and one of the notable alleged and false victims of the Stara Gradiška concentration camp (d. 1946)
1865 – Neltje Blanchan, American historian and author (d. 1918)
1869 – John Heisman, American football player and coach (d. 1936)
1870 – Francis Kelley, Canadian-American bishop (d. 1948)
1873 – William D. Coolidge, American physicist and engineer (d. 1975)
1874 – Charles Kilpatrick, American runner and educator (d. 1921)
1875 – Gilbert N. Lewis, American chemist and academic (d. 1946)
1876 – Franz Schlegelberger, German judge and politician, Reich Ministry of Justice (d. 1970)
1880 – Dominikus Böhm, German architect (d. 1955)
  1880   – Una O'Connor, Irish-American actress and singer (d. 1959)
1883 – Hugo Wast, Argentine writer (d. 1962)
1885 – Lawren Harris, Canadian painter and educator (d. 1970)
1888 – Onésime Gagnon, Canadian scholar and politician, 20th Lieutenant Governor of Quebec (d. 1961)
1892 – Speckled Red, American blues/boogie-woogie piano player and singer-songwriter (d. 1973)
1894 – Rube Bressler, American baseball player (d. 1966)
  1894   – Emma Vyssotsky, American astronomer and academic (d. 1975)
1896 – Lilyan Tashman, American actress (d. 1934)
1897 – John Baker, English air marshal (d. 1978)
  1897   – Juan Ignacio Luca de Tena, Spanish writer (d. 1975)
1899 – Bernt Balchen, Norwegian aviator (d. 1973)
1900 – Douglas Jardine, Indian-English cricketer and lawyer (d. 1958)

1901–present
1902 – Robert Eberan von Eberhorst, Austrian engineer (d. 1982)
  1902   – Luther Evans, American political scientist and politician (d. 1981)
1904 – Harvey Penick, American golfer and coach (d. 1995)
1905 – Felix Bloch, Swiss physicist and academic, Nobel Prize laureate (d. 1983)
  1905   – Yen Chia-kan, Chinese lawyer and politician, President of the Republic of China (d. 1993)
  1905   – Gertrude Ederle, American swimmer (d. 2003)
1908 – František Douda, Czech shot putter (d. 1990)
  1908   – Ilya Frank, Russian physicist and academic, Nobel Prize laureate (d. 1990)
1909 – Zellig Harris, American linguist and methodologist (d. 1992)
1910 – Richard Mortensen, Danish painter and educator (d. 1993)
  1910   – Hayden Rorke, American actor (d. 1987)
1911 – Jack Keller, American hurdler (d. 1978)
1915 – Simo Puupponen, Finnish writer (d. 1967)
1918 – Augusta Dabney, American actress (d. 2008)
  1918   – James Daly, American actor (d. 1978)
  1918   – Paul Rudolph, American architect and academic, designed the Lippo Centre (d. 1997)
1919 – Manolis Andronikos, Greek archaeologist and academic (d. 1992)
1920 – Ted Fujita, Japanese-American meteorologist and academic (d. 1998)
  1920   – Bob Montana, American illustrator (d. 1975)
  1920   – Gianni Rodari, Italian writer (d. 1980)
  1920   – Vern Stephens, American baseball player (d. 1968)
1922 – Jean Barker, Baroness Trumpington, English politician (d. 2018)
  1922   – Coleen Gray, American actress (d. 2015)
1923 – Aslam Farrukhi, Indian-Pakistani linguist, author, and scholar (d. 2016)
  1923   – Ned Rorem, American composer and author (d. 2022)
  1923   – Frank Sutton, American actor (d. 1974)
1924 – Arthur Brittenden, English journalist (d. 2015)
1925 – Johnny Carson, American comedian and talk show host (d. 2005)
  1925   – Manos Hatzidakis, Greek composer and theorist (d. 1994)
  1925   – Fred Shero, Canadian-American ice hockey player and coach (d. 1990)
1927 – Sonny Criss, American saxophonist and composer (d. 1977)
  1927   – Dezső Gyarmati, Hungarian water polo player and coach (d. 2013)
  1927   – Leszek Kołakowski, Polish-English historian and philosopher (d. 2009)
1929 – Luis Alarcón, Chilean actor
  1929   – Shamsur Rahman, Bangladeshi poet and journalist (d. 2006)
1930 – Unto Mononen, Finnish musician (d. 1968)
1931 – Jim Bunning, American baseball player and politician (d. 2017)
  1931   – William P. Clark, Jr., American judge and politician, 12th United States National Security Advisor (d. 2013)
  1931   – Diana Dors, English actress (d. 1984)
1932 – Vasily Belov, Russian novelist, poet and playwright (d. 2012)
1933 – Carol Fran, American singer-songwriter and pianist (d. 2021)
  1933   – Carlos Lemos Simmonds, sixth Vice President of Columbia (d. 2003)
1934 – Caitro Soto, Afro-Peruvian musician (d. 2004)
1935 – Chi-Chi Rodríguez, Puerto Rican-American golfer
  1935   – JacSue Kehoe, American neuroscientist  (d. 2019)
1936 – Charles Goodhart, English economist and academic
  1936   – Philip Kaufman, American director, producer, and screenwriter
1937 – Johnny Carroll, American rockabilly musician (d. 1995)
  1937   – Carlos Lamarca, Brazilian captain (d. 1971)
  1937   – Deven Verma, Indian actor, director, and producer (d. 2014)
1938 – Alan G`ilzean, Scottish footballer and manager (d. 2018)
1939 – Charlie Foxx, American R&B/soul singer and guitarist (d. 1998)
  1939   – C. V. Vigneswaran, Sri Lankan lawyer, judge, and politician, 1st Chief Minister of the Northern Province
1940 – Ellie Greenwich, American singer-songwriter and producer (d. 2009)
  1940   – Jane Holzer, American model, actress, producer, and art collector
  1940   – Pelé, Brazilian footballer and actor (d. 2022)
1941 – René Metge, French rally driver
  1941   – Colin Milburn, English cricketer (d. 1990)
  1941   – Igor Smirnov, Moldovan engineer and politician, 1st President of Transnistria
1942 – Michael Crichton, American author, director, producer, and screenwriter (d. 2008)
  1942   – Douglas Dunn, Scottish poet, critic, and academic
  1942   – Bernd Erdmann, German footballer and manager
  1942   – Anita Roddick, English businesswoman and activist, founded The Body Shop (d. 2007)
1943 – Alida Chelli, Italian actress and singer (d. 2012)
1944 – Mike Harding, English singer-songwriter and comedian
1945 – Maggi Hambling, English sculptor and painter
  1945   – Kim Larsen, Danish singer-songwriter and guitarist (d. 2018)
  1945   – Graça Machel, Mozambican politician and humanitarian
  1945   – Ernie Watts, American saxophonist
  1945   – Maury Yeston, American composer, lyricist, and music theorist
1946 – Graeme Barker, English archaeologist and academic
  1946   – Alicia Borinsky, Argentine writer
  1946   – Mel Martínez, American lawyer and politician, 12th United States Secretary of Housing and Urban Development
  1946   – Miklós Németh, Hungarian javelin thrower
1947 – Abdel Aziz al-Rantisi, co-founder of the Palestinian movement Hamas (d. 2004)
  1947   – Kazimierz Deyna, Polish footballer (d. 1989)
  1947   – Greg Ridley, English bass player (d. 2003)
1948 – Hermann Hauser, Austrian-English businessman, co-founded Acorn Computers and Olivetti Research Laboratory
  1948   – Gerry Robinson, Irish-born British businessman, arts patron and television personality
  1948   – Brian Ross, American journalist
  1948   – Jordi Sabatés, Spanish musician
1949 – Krešimir Ćosić, Croatian soldier and politician
  1949   – Oscar Martínez, Argentine theater actor
  1949   – Nick Tosches, American journalist, author, and poet (d. 2019)
  1949   – Würzel, English singer and guitarist (d. 2011)
1950 – Maths O. Sundqvist, Swedish businessman (d. 2012)
1951 – Charly García, Argentine singer-songwriter and keyboard player 
  1951   – Ángel de Andrés López, Spanish actor (d. 2016)
  1951   – Fatmir Sejdiu, Kosovan academic and politician, 2nd President of Kosovo
  1951   – David Wills, American country music singer-songwriter and guitarist
1952 – Pierre Moerlen, French drummer (d. 2005)
  1952   – Ken Tipton, American actor, director, producer, and screenwriter
1953 – Taner Akçam, Turkish sociologist and historian
  1953   – Joaquín Lavín, Chilean politician and economist
1954 – Ang Lee, Taiwanese-American director, producer, and screenwriter
1956 – Adam Nawałka, Polish football player and manager
  1956   – Darrell Pace, American archer
  1956   – Dianne Reeves, American singer
  1956   – Dwight Yoakam, American singer-songwriter, guitarist, and actor
1957 – Paul Kagame, Rwandan soldier and politician, 6th President of Rwanda
  1957   – Graham Rix, English footballer and coach
1958 – Michael Eric Dyson, American activist, author, and academic
  1958   – Rose Nabinger, German singer
  1958   – Frank Schaffer, German sprinter
1959 – Nancy Grace, American lawyer and journalist
  1959   – Sam Raimi, American actor, director, producer, and screenwriter
  1959   – "Weird Al" Yankovic, American singer-songwriter, comedian, and actor
1960 – Mirwais Ahmadzaï, Swiss-French keyboard player, songwriter, and producer 
  1960   – Katoucha Niane, French model and actress (d. 2008)
  1960   – Randy Pausch, American author and academic (d. 2008)
  1960   – Wayne Rainey, American motorcycle racer
1961 – Laurie Halse Anderson, American author
  1961   – Vinicio Gómez, Guatemalan politician (d. 2008)
  1961   – Andoni Zubizarreta, Spanish footballer and sportscaster
1962 – Doug Flutie, American football player, sportscaster, and drummer
1963 – Gordon Korman, Canadian-American author
  1963   – Rashidi Yekini, Nigerian footballer (d. 2012)
1964 – Anabell López, Cuban singer
  1964   – Robert Trujillo, American bass player and songwriter
  1964   – Eddy Cue, American computer scientist and businessman
1965 – Augusten Burroughs, American author and screenwriter
  1965   – Al Leiter, American baseball player and sportscaster
1966 – Alex Zanardi, Italian racing driver and cyclist
1967 – Dale Crover, American singer-songwriter, drummer, and producer 
  1967   – Omar Linares, Cuban baseball player
  1967   – Walt Flanagan, American actor and illustrator
  1967   – Jaime Yzaga, Peruvian tennis player
1969 – Dolly Buster, Czech film producer and director, actress and author
  1969   – Trudi Canavan, Australian author and illustrator
  1969   – Bill O'Brien, American football player and coach
  1969   – Brooke Theiss, American actress
1970 – Matthew Barzun, American diplomat, United States Ambassador to the United Kingdom
  1970   – Grant Imahara, American television presenter and engineer (d. 2020)
  1970   – Kenji Nomura, Japanese voice actor
  1970   – Zoe Wiseman, American model and photographer
1971 – Carlo Forlivesi, Italian-Japanese composer and scholar
  1971   – Chris Horner, American cyclist
1972 – Kate del Castillo, Mexican actress
  1972   – Tiffeny Milbrett, American soccer player
  1972   – Dominika Paleta, Polish-Mexican actress
  1972   – Eduardo Paret, Cuban baseball player
  1972   – Bryan Pratt, American lawyer and politician
  1972   – Jasmin St. Claire, Virgin Islander-American actress
  1972   – Jimmy Wayne, American singer-songwriter and guitarist
1973 – Christian Dailly, Scottish footballer
1974 – Aravind Adiga, Indian journalist and author
  1974   – Beatrice Faumuina, New Zealand discus thrower
  1974   – Sander Westerveld, Dutch footballer
  1974   – Christine Yoshikawa, Canadian pianist
1975 – Jessicka, American singer-songwriter 
  1975   – Michelle Beadle, American sportscaster
  1975   – Odalys García, Cuban actress
  1975   – Phillip Gillespie, Australian cricket umpire
  1975   – Yoon Son-ha, South Korean actress and singer
  1975   – Keith Van Horn, American basketball player
  1975   – Manuela Velasco, Spanish actress
1976 – Cat Deeley, English model, actress, and television host
  1976   – Sergio Diduch, Argentine footballer
  1976   – Ryan Reynolds, Canadian-American actor and producer
1977 – Brad Haddin, Australian cricketer
  1977   – Alex Tudor, English cricketer and coach
1978 – Jimmy Bullard, English footballer
  1978   – Steve Harmison, English cricketer and sportscaster
  1978   – John Lackey, American baseball player
  1978   – Archie Thompson, New Zealand-Australian footballer
1979 – Ramón Castro, Venezuelan baseball player
  1979   – Simon Davies, Welsh footballer
   1979  – Prabhas, Telugu film actor
  1979   – Jorge Solís, Mexican boxer
  1979   – Bud Smith, American baseball player
1980 – Mate Bilić, Croatian footballer
  1980   – Pedro Liriano, Dominican baseball player
1981 – Daniela Alvarado, Venezuelan actress
  1981   – Jeroen Bleekemolen, Dutch racing driver
  1981   – Leticia Dolera, Spanish actress
  1981   – Ben Francisco, American baseball player
  1981   – Lee Ki-woo, South Korean actor
  1981   – Jackie Long, American actor and producer
  1981   – Mirel Rădoi, Romanian footballer
  1981   – Huo Siyan, Chinese actress
1982 – Valentin Badea, Romanian footballer
  1982   – Rickey Paulding, American basketball player
  1982   – Kristjan Kangur, Estonian basketball player
  1982   – Aleksandar Luković, Serbian footballer
  1982   – Rodolfo Dantas Bispo, Brazilian footballer
1983 – Filippos Darlas, Greek footballer
  1983   – Valentin Demyanenko, Ukrainian-born Azerbaijani canoeist
  1983   – Goldie Harvey, Nigerian singer-songwriter (d. 2013)
1984 – Izabel Goulart, Brazilian model
  1984   – Jeffrey Hoogervorst, Dutch footballer
  1984   – Simone Masini, Italian footballer
  1984   – Meghan McCain, American journalist and author
  1984   – Michael Sim, Australian golfer
  1984   – Keiren Westwood, English footballer
1985 – Miguel, American singer-songwriter and producer
  1985   – Mohammed Abdellaoue, Norwegian footballer
  1985   – Masiela Lusha, Albanian-American actress, poet, and humanitarian
  1985   – Chris Neal, English footballer
  1985   – Luca Spinetti, Italian footballer
  1985   – Panagiotis Vouis, Greek footballer
1986 – Emilia Clarke, English actress
  1986   – Briana Evigan, American actress and dancer
  1986   – Jovanka Radičević, Montenegrin handball player
  1986   – Jake Robinson, English footballer
  1986   – Jessica Stroup, American actress
1987 – Faye, Swedish singer-songwriter
  1987   – Robin Copeland, Irish rugby player
  1987   – Félix Doubront, Venezuelan baseball player
  1987   – Kyle Gibson, American baseball player
  1987   – Seo In-guk, South Korean singer and actor
  1987   – Miyuu Sawai, Japanese model and actress
  1987   – Naomi Watanabe, Japanese actress
1988 – Jordan Crawford, American basketball player
  1988   – Aleksandr Salugin, Russian footballer
  1988   – Carolin Schiewe, German footballer
1989 – Viktor Agardius, Swedish footballer
  1989   – Alain Broja, Venezuelan footballer
  1989   – Jonita Gandhi, Indo-Canadian singer
  1989   – Anisya Kirdyapkina, Russian race walker
  1989   – Andriy Yarmolenko, Ukrainian footballer
1990 – Paradise Oskar, Finnish singer-songwriter and guitarist
1991 – Emil Forsberg, Swedish footballer
  1991   – Jorge Taufua, Australian rugby league player
  1991   – Princess Mako of Akishino, member of the Japanese Imperial Family
1993 – Josh Ruffels, English footballer
1997 – Jaydn Su'A, New Zealand rugby league player
1998 – Amandla Stenberg, American actress
1999 – Yui Kobayashi, Japanese idol
2002 – Shin Eun-soo, South Korean actress

Deaths

Pre-1600
42 BC – Marcus Junius Brutus the Younger, Roman general and politician (b. 85 BC)
 877 – Ignatios of Constantinople, Byzantine patriarch (b. 797)
 891 – Yazaman al-Khadim, Abbasid general and politician
 902 – Ibrahim II of Ifriqiya, Aghlabid emir (b. 850)
 930 – Daigo, Japanese emperor (b. 885)
 945 – Hyejong of Goryeo, Korean king (b. 912)
 949 – Yōzei, Japanese emperor (b. 869)
1134 – Abu al-Salt, Andalusian polymath
1157 – Sweyn III, Danish king (b. c. 1125)
1456 – John of Capistrano, Italian priest and saint (b. 1386)
1550 – Tiedemann Giese, Polish bishop (b. 1480)
1581 – Michael Neander, German mathematician and astronomer (b. 1529)

1601–1900
1616 – Leonhard Hutter, German theologian and academic (b. 1563)
1688 – Charles du Fresne, sieur du Cange, French philologist and historian (b. 1610)
1730 – Anne Oldfield, English actress (b. 1683)
1764 – Emmanuel-Auguste de Cahideuc, Comte Dubois de la Motte, French admiral (b. 1683)
1774 – Michel Benoist, French missionary and astronomer (b. 1715)
1852 – Georg August Wallin, Finnish explorer, orientalist, and professor (b. 1811)
1867 – Franz Bopp, German linguist and academic (b. 1791)
1869 – Edward Smith-Stanley, 14th Earl of Derby, English lawyer and politician, Prime Minister of the United Kingdom (b. 1799)
1872 – Théophile Gautier, French journalist, author, and poet (b. 1811)
1885 – Charles S. West, American lawyer, jurist,  and politician, Secretary of State of Texas (b. 1829)
1893 – Alexander of Battenberg (b. 1857)

1901–present
1910 – Chulalongkorn, Thai king (b. 1853)
1915 – W. G. Grace, English cricketer and physician (b. 1848)
1916 – Richard McFadden, Scottish footballer and soldier (b. 1889)
1917 – Eugène Grasset, Swiss illustrator (b. 1845)
1921 – John Boyd Dunlop, Scottish businessman, founded Dunlop Rubber (b. 1840)
1935 – Charles Demuth, American painter and educator (b. 1883)
1939 – Zane Grey, American dentist and author (b. 1872)
1942 – Ralph Rainger, American pianist and composer (b. 1901)
1943 – Wakashima Gonshirō, Japanese sumo wrestler, the 21st Yokozuna (b. 1876)
1944 – Charles Glover Barkla, English-Scottish physicist and academic, Nobel Prize laureate (b. 1877)
  1944   – Hana Brady, Czech holocaust victim (b. 1931)
1950 – Al Jolson, Lithuanian-American actor and singer (b. 1886)
1953 – Adrien de Noailles, French son of Jules Charles Victurnien de Noailles (b. 1869)
1959 – George Bouzianis, Greek painter (b. 1885)
  1959   – Gerda Lundequist, Swedish actress (b. 1871)
1964 – Frank Luther Mott, American historian and journalist (b. 1886)
1975 – Marjorie Maynard British artist and farmer (b. 1891)
1978 – Maybelle Carter, American singer and autoharp player (Carter Family) (b. 1909)
1980 – Tibor Rosenbaum, Hungarian-born Swiss rabbi and businessman (b. 1923)
1983 – Jessica Savitch, American journalist (b. 1947)
1984 – Oskar Werner, Austrian-German actor (b. 1922)
1986 – Edward Adelbert Doisy, American biochemist and academic, Nobel Prize laureate (b. 1893)
1988 – Asashio Tarō III, Japanese sumo wrestler, the 46th Yokozuna (b. 1929)
1989 – Armida, Mexican-American actress, singer, and dancer (b. 1911)
1990 – Thomas Williams, American author and academic (b. 1926)
1994 – Robert Lansing, American actor (b. 1928)
1996 – Bob Grim, American baseball player (b. 1930)
1997 – Bert Haanstra, Dutch director, producer, and screenwriter (b. 1916)
1998 – Barnett Slepian, American physician (b. 1946)
1999 – Eric Reece, Australian politician, 32nd Premier of Tasmania (b. 1909)
2000 – Yokozuna, American wrestler (b. 1966) 
2001 – Josh Kirby, English illustrator (b. 1928)
  2001   – Daniel Wildenstein, French art dealer and historian (b. 1917)
2002 – Adolph Green, American playwright and songwriter (b. 1915)
2003 – Tony Capstick, English actor and singer (b. 1944)
  2003   – Soong Mei-ling, Chinese wife of Chiang Kai-shek, 2nd First Lady of the Republic of China (b. 1898)
2004 – Robert Merrill, American actor and singer (b. 1919)
  2004   – Bill Nicholson, English footballer, coach, and manager (b. 1919)
2005 – William Hootkins, American actor (b. 1948)
  2005   – John Muth, American economist and academic (b. 1930)
  2005   – Stella Obasanjo, Nigerian wife of Olusegun Obasanjo, 10th First Lady of Nigeria (b. 1945)
2006 – Lebo Mathosa, South African singer (Boom Shaka) (b. 1977)
2007 – John Ilhan, Turkish-Australian businessman, founded Crazy John's (b. 1965)
  2007   – Lim Goh Tong, Malaysian-Chinese businessman (b. 1918)
2008 – Kevin Finnegan, English boxer (b. 1948)
2009 – Lou Jacobi, Canadian-American actor (b. 1913)
2010 – Fran Crippen, American swimmer (b. 1984)
  2010   – Stanley Tanger, American businessman and philanthropist, founded the Tanger Factory Outlet Centers (b. 1923)
2011 – Herbert A. Hauptman, American chemist and mathematician, Nobel Prize laureate (b. 1917)
  2011   – Marco Simoncelli, Italian motorcycle racer (b. 1987)
2012 – William Joel Blass, American lawyer and politician (b. 1917)
  2012   – Wilhelm Brasse, Polish photographer (b. 1917)
  2012   – Roland de la Poype, French soldier and pilot (b. 1920)
  2012   – Sunil Gangopadhyay, Indian author and poet (b. 1934)
  2012   – Michael Marra, Scottish singer-songwriter (b. 1952)
2013 – Wes Bialosuknia, American basketball player (b. 1945)
  2013   – Anthony Caro, English sculptor and academic (b. 1924)
  2013   – Niall Donohue, Irish hurler (b. 1990)
  2013   – Gypie Mayo, English guitarist and songwriter (Dr. Feelgood and The Yardbirds) (b. 1951)
  2013   – Bill Mazer, Ukrainian-American journalist and sportscaster (b. 1920)
2014 – Ghulam Azam, Bangladeshi politician (b. 1922)
  2014   – John Bramlett, American football player (b. 1941)
  2014   – Bernard Mayes, English-American journalist and academic (b. 1929)
  2014   – Joan Quigley, American astrologer and author (b. 1927)
  2014   – Tullio Regge, Italian physicist and academic (b. 1931)
  2014   – Alvin Stardust, English singer and actor (b. 1942)
2015 – Leon Bibb, American-Canadian singer (b. 1922)
  2015   – Roger De Clerck, Belgian businessman (b. 1924)
  2015   – Jim Roberts, Canadian-American ice hockey player and coach (b. 1940)
  2015   – Fred Sands, American businessman and philanthropist, co-founded the Museum of Contemporary Art (b. 1938)
2016 – Jack Chick, American cartoonist and publisher (b. 1924)
  2016   – Wim van der Voort, Dutch speed skater (b. 1923)
  2016   – Pete Burns, English singer-songwriter (b. 1959)
2017 – Walter Lassally, German cinematographer (b. 1926)
2018 – Todd Reid, Australian tennis player (b. 1984)
2022 – Adriano Moreira, Portuguese politician, Minister of the Overseas Provinces, President of the CDS – People's Party (b. 1922)

Holidays and observances
Christian feast day:
Feast of the Most Holy Redeemer
James the Just (i.e. James, brother of Jesus) (Lutheran, Episcopal Church (USA), Eastern Orthodox) 
Allucio of Campugliano
Amon of Toul (Diocese of Toul)
Anicius Manlius Severinus Boethius
Ignatios of Constantinople
John of Capistrano
Joséphine Leroux
Peter Pascual
Romain (Romanus) of Rouen
Servandus and Cermanus
Severin of Cologne
October 23 (Eastern Orthodox liturgics)
 Christmas or the Feast of Señor Noemi (the Child Jesus) in the Apostolic Catholic Church
Aviator's Day (Brazil) 
Chulalongkorn Day (Thailand)
Day of the Macedonian Revolutionary Struggle (Republic of North Macedonia)
Liberation Day (Libya) 
Mole Day (International observance)
National Day (Hungary)
Paris Peace Agreement Day (Cambodia)

References

External links

 
 
 

Days of the year
October